Balzaminov's Marriage is a 1964 Soviet comedy film directed by Konstantin Voynov and loosely based on three plays by Alexander Ostrovsky: "Celebratory Daydream is Only Before Dinner", "Two Dogs Fight, the Third Keep Away" and "Whatever You Look for, You'll Find".

Cast
 Georgy Vitsin as Misha Balzaminov
 Lyudmila Shagalova as Pavla Balzamonova, his Mother
 Lidiya Smirnova as Akulina Krasvina, Matchmaker
 Ekaterina Savinova as Matryona
 Zhanna Prokhorenko as Kapochka Nichkina
 Lyudmila Gurchenko as Ustinka, Kapochka friend
 Tamara Nosova as Kapochka's mother
 Nikolai Kryuchkov as Neuyedenov, Kapochka's uncle
 Rolan Bykov as Lukyan Chebakov
 Inna Makarova as Anfisa Pezhonova, older sister
 Nadezhda Rumyantseva as Raisa Pezhonova, younger sister
 Tatyana Konyukhova as Khimka
 Nonna Mordyukova as Domna Belotelova
 Grigory Shpigel as policeman

External links
 

1964 films
Mosfilm films
Films based on works by Alexander Ostrovsky
Films shot in Vladimir Oblast
1964 comedy films
Soviet comedy films
Russian comedy films
1960s Russian-language films